The Fairey Fulmar is a British carrier-borne reconnaissance aircraft/fighter aircraft which was developed and manufactured by aircraft company Fairey Aviation. It was named after the northern fulmar, a seabird native to the British Isles. The Fulmar served with the Royal Navy's Fleet Air Arm (FAA) during the Second World War.

The design of the Fulmar was based on that of the earlier Fairey P.4/34, a land-based light bomber developed during 1936 as a replacement for the Fairey Battle light bomber. Fairey had redesigned the aircraft as a navalised observation/fighter aircraft to satisfy the requirements of Specification O.8/38, for which it was selected. Although its performance (like that of its Battle antecedent) was unspectacular, the Fulmar was a reliable, sturdy aircraft with long range and an effective armament of eight machine guns; the type could also be put into production relatively quickly.  On 4 January 1940, the first production aircraft made its first flight and delivery commenced shortly thereafter, while production of an improved model, the Fulmar Mk II, started during January 1941. Fairey produced a total of 600 Fulmars at its Stockport factory between January 1940 and December 1942.

During July 1940, No. 806 Squadron became the first FAA squadron to receive the Fulmar. The Fulmar was heavily used in the North African Campaign, flying convoy protection patrols to and from the island of Malta, and providing air cover for Fairey Swordfish torpedo bombers during attacks such as the Battle of Cape Matapan. By autumn 1940, it had been recorded as having shot down ten Italian bombers and six enemy fighters. The Fulmar was also deployed to the Far East, where it proved largely incapable of matching the Japanese-built Mitsubishi A6M Zero. During the later stages of the conflict, it was relegated from the fighter role by single-seat aircraft such as the British-built Supermarine Seafire and the American-built Grumman Martlet fighters. While continuing service as a trainer and reconnaissance aircraft for a time, the Fulmar was withdrawn from front line service in February 1945.

Design and development

Background
The Fulmar has its origins in the Fairey P.4/34, which had been developed in response to the issuing of Specification P.4/34 by the British Air Ministry. P.4/34 had sought a light bomber that would be capable of being used as a dive bomber; in addition to Fairey's entry, competing submissions came in the form of the Hawker Henley and an unbuilt Gloster design. Despite the P.4/34's relatively high maximum speed of 284 mph, the rival Henley, which was capable of attaining 300 mph, was selected and eventually ordered; in service, the Henley was largely used as a target tug.

The Fulmar was basically a version of the P.4/34 which had been adapted for naval use. Fairey submitted their modified design as a response to Specification O.8/38, which called for a two-crew fighter capable of observation and fleet defence operations. As the prospective aircraft was not expected to encounter any major fighter opposition, as Nazi Germany, Britain's only foreseen enemy during this era, possessed no aircraft carriers of its own, factors such as long range and heavy armament were considered to be more important than a high level of either manoeuvrability or speed. As the type was intended to routinely perform lengthy flights over the ocean, the presence of a navigator / wireless operator was considered to be an essential element, especially when flying at nighttime or during poor weather conditions.

Possessing a substantial resemblance to the earlier Fairey Battle, the Fulmar prototype was an aerodynamically cleaner aircraft and featured a folding wing that was  shorter. On 13 January 1937, the prototype P.4/34 serial number K5099 conducted its maiden flight at Fairey Aviation's Great West Aerodrome (this site has since been occupied by London Heathrow Airport), the Fairey test pilot Chris Staniland was at the controls. During 1938, the name Fulmar was picked for the type, although this was not announced until deliveries of the type commenced during 1940.

Production and further development
The first prototype Fulmar, which acted as a "flying mock-up", was powered by a single Rolls-Royce Merlin III engine, which was capable of generating up to 1,080 hp (810 kW). Flight testing revealed the prototype's performance to be relatively poor, the highest speed it could attain being 230 mph (370 km/h). Following the adoption of the more powerful Merlin VIII engine – a variant unique to the Fulmar and with supercharging optimised for low-level flight, as well as various aerodynamic improvements made to the airframe, the prototype's speed was increased to 265 mph (426 km/h) when flown at an altitude of 7500 ft (2286m). Due to the desperate requirement for more modern fighters to equip Britain's carrier fleet, the Fulmar's performance was considered adequate.

As a relatively straightforward derivative of an existing prototype, the Fulmar promised to be available in quantity quickly; during mid-1938, an initial order for 127 production aircraft was placed by the Royal Navy. Beyond Britain's own plans for the type, the Danish Navy also took a keen interest in the Fulmar; at one point, plans were in motion to produce the aircraft under licence in Denmark; however, such ambitions were terminated by the outbreak of the Second World War. Furthermore, while a float plane model of the aircraft was designed and promoted, no such aircraft would ever be constructed. On 4 January 1940, the first production aircraft flew from Fairey's facility at RAF Ringway near Manchester; the final of 600 Fulmars was delivered from Ringway on 11 December 1942.

During January 1941, production of the improved Fulmar Mk II commenced; the first Mk II aircraft was delivered to an operational squadron in March 1941. This model of the aircraft was furnished with the more powerful Merlin XXX engine; the airframe had provision for a 60-gallon (273 litre) centre-line drop tank and provision to carry a 250 lb (114 kg) or 500 lb (227 kg) bomb in lieu of the drop tank. During June 1942, flight testing of the Fulmar II was conducted at Boscombe Down; these tests found that the Fulmar could safely drop a 500 lb bomb during 60-degree dives at up to 310 knots. Fulmars were launched from catapults on merchant ships, a convoy defensive plan that was being evaluated at the time.

N1854, the first production Fulmar, was later modified to Mk II standard and re-designated G-AIBE, after which it was used as Fairey's hack for some time. During June 1959, it reverted to service markings and was seen at Farnborough at the SBAC show on 8 September 1962; G-AIBE'''s last flight was conducted three months later on 18 December 1962. During 1972, the aircraft was presented to the Fleet Air Arm Museum, Yeovilton, where it has been preserved and is on static display.

Operational history

During July 1940, the first squadron of the Fleet Air Arm to be equipped with the Fulmar was No. 806 Squadron, this squadron commenced operations from the aircraft carrier  shortly afterwards. The Navy had specified a two-seat machine so that the pilot would have the assistance of another crew member in reporting back to the fleet the observations made, which were done using wireless telegraphy (W/T) and to navigate over the ocean. The Fulmar was too large and lacked manoeuvrability against single-seat, land-based opposition, as it did in the Mediterranean Theatre; its performance was clearly inferior to typical land-based fighters. The long range of the Fulmar was often useful at times.

The Fulmar was one of several British aircraft to participate in the North African Campaign. During September 1940, the Fulmar first saw action while flying convoy protection patrols to and from the island of Malta. When reinforcements were being dispatched to Malta, Fulmars guided flights of carrier-launched Hurricane and Spitfire fighters. The relatively sturdy Fulmar was able to achieve dozens of victories against its Italian and German adversaries. The first recorded kill by a Fulmar was scored on 2 September 1940. By October of that year, Fulmar pilots had claimed the shooting down of ten Italian bombers. The type proved particularly effective against Italian reconnaissance aircraft.  Later on, thirteen Fulmars onboard the aircraft carrier  also participated in the Battle of Cape Matapan, strafing the battleship Vittorio Veneto whilst trying to draw fire away from the attacking Fairey Swordfish and Fairey Albacore torpedo bombers.Stephen, p. 59

The Fulmar was also deployed in other theatres, including the Eastern Front. The type was a common constituent of the numerous Arctic convoys of World War II. Fulmars also played a prominent role in Operation EF, the ill-fated air raid on Axis-held facilities Kirkenes and Petsamo conducted during July 1941. During early 1942, multiple Fulmar-equipped squadrons were deployed to the Pacific Theatre against the Japanese Empire, while two squadrons were dispatched to defend Ceylon. On engaging with the nimble and lightly armoured Mitsubishi A6M Zero fighter and Aichi D3A Val dive bomber, the Fulmar quickly proved to have been outclassed against the Zero and six Fulmars were lost in exchange for four Aichi D3A Vals and one Nakajima B5N Kate.Smith 2014, pp. ix, 85.  Despite this, more Fulmars were dispatched to the Far East.

Throughout 1942, the Fulmar was being gradually replaced as a naval fighter by single-seat aircraft that had been adapted from land fighters, such as the British Hawker Sea Hurricane and Supermarine Seafire or the American Grumman Martlet. The Fulmar was to figure prominently in the Mediterranean during 1941 and 1942 as the primary fighter of the Fleet Air Arm for most of the Malta convoys during those years. 16 Fulmars were present on Victorious during the penultimate Operation Pedestal which was to be their last major carrier borne operation. The type continued to be operated, providing useful service as a night convoy escort and intruder, it was also used to train crews for the newer and more advanced Fairey Barracuda. Following their withdrawal from the fighter role, Fulmars were used for long-range reconnaissance missions. Unarmed Fulmars would also see service in Africa as communications and despatch aircraft.

At its peak, twenty squadrons of the Fleet Air Arm were equipped with the Fulmar. It flew from eight fleet aircraft carriers and five escort carriers. No. 273 Squadron RAF operated them for some months in 1942 from China Bay, Ceylon, seeing action against Japanese forces during the raid on 9 April 1942, though about half the squadron personnel were Navy. Fulmars was recorded as having destroyed 112 enemy aircraft against the loss of 40 Fulmars, which made the type the leading fighter type in terms of aircraft shot down to be operated by the Fleet Air Arm during the war.

Approximately 100 Fulmars were converted to a night fighter variant but the type achieved only limited success in this role. Some of the early marks of the aircraft were also operated from CAM ships. Vichy French forces reportedly captured a Fulmar Mk I, which had been forced to land while flying a reconnaissance mission over Senegal during March 1941. This Fulmar was repaired and operated for some time by the Group de Chasse I/4.

According to pilots, its flight characteristics were considered to be pleasant, while its widely spaced undercarriage provided good deck handling and it had excellent fuel capacity and range. Most Fleet Air Arm fighter aces scored at least some of their victories while flying Fulmars; the first pilot to score five kills while flying the type was Sub-Lieutenant Jackie Sewell. Sub-Lieutenant Stanley Orr finished the war with twelve confirmed air victories, the third-highest scoring pilot in the FAA.

Variants
Mk.I
First production variant powered by a 1,035 hp (772 kW) (1,275 hp at take off) Rolls-Royce Merlin VIII; 8 × .303 Browning Mk.II (750 rounds per gun), 250 built.
Mk.II
Updated variant powered by a 1,300 hp (970 kW) Merlin XXX with a new propeller and the addition of tropical equipment; 8 × .303 Browning Mk.II (1,000 rounds per gun) or 4 × .50 Browning AN/M2 – part of the last batch (170 rounds per gun, in other sources specified 370 rounds per gun), some finished as night fighters, one prototype converted from a Mk.I and 350 built.
NF Mk.II
Mk.II night fighter with an Air Interception AI Mk. IV radar (1 aircraft) or AI Mk.X radar (other); 4 × .50 Browning AN/M2 – about 50 aircraft (other 8 × .303 Browning Mk.II), total were converted from the Mk.II nearly 100 aircraft.

Operators

 Royal Air Force
 No. 273 Squadron RAF
 Fleet Air Arm
 731 Naval Air Squadron (Deck Landing Control Officer training)
 740 Naval Air Squadron (Observer Training Squadron)
 746 Naval Air Squadron (Night Fighter Interception Unit)
 748 Naval Air Squadron (Naval Fighter Pool)
 759 Naval Air Squadron (RNAS Fighter School)
 760 Naval Air Squadron
 761 Naval Air Squadron (RNAS Fighter School)
 762 Naval Air Squadron (RNAS Fighter School)
 766 Naval Air Squadron
 767 Naval Air Squadron
 768 Naval Air Squadron
 769 Naval Air Squadron
 772 Naval Air Squadron (Fleet Requirements Unit)
 775 Naval Air Squadron (Fleet Requirements Unit)
 777 Naval Air Squadron (Fleet Requirements Unit)
 778 Naval Air Squadron
 784 Naval Air Squadron (Night Fighter Training Unit)
 787 Naval Air Squadron (Fighter Development Unit)
 790 Naval Air Squadron
 795 Naval Air Squadron (East African Fighter Pool)
 800 Naval Air Squadron
 803 Naval Air Squadron
 804 Naval Air Squadron
 805 Naval Air Squadron
 806 Naval Air Squadron
 807 Naval Air Squadron
 808 Naval Air Squadron
 809 Naval Air Squadron
 813 Naval Air Squadron (Night Sqn.)
 879 Naval Air Squadron
 884 Naval Air Squadron
 886 Naval Air Squadron
 887 Naval Air Squadron
 889 Naval Air Squadron
 893 Naval Air Squadron

Surviving aircraft

The only known survivor is N1854, the Fulmar prototype (and first production Mk I) at the Fleet Air Arm Museum, Yeovilton. The only known surviving Rolls-Royce Merlin VIII engine is in a private collection in the UK and came from Fulmar Mk I, N1926.

Specifications (Fulmar Mk II)

See also

References

Citations

Bibliography

 Bishop, Chris. The Encyclopedia of Weapons of World War II., Sterling Publishing Company, 2002. .
 Brown, David. Fairey Fulmar Mks I & II, Aircraft Number 254. London: Profile Publications, 1973. No ISBN.
 Brown, Eric, CBE, DCS, AFC, RN., William Green and Gordon Swanborough. "Fairey Fulmar". Wings of the Navy, Flying Allied Carrier Aircraft of World War Two. London: Jane's Publishing Company, 1980, pp. 69–78. .
 Bussy, Geoffrey. Fairey Fulmar, Warpaint Series No.41. Luton, Bedfordshire, UK: Warpaint Books Ltd., 2004. No ISBN.
 Fredriksen, John C. International Warbirds: An Illustrated Guide to World Military Aircraft, 1914-2000. ABC-CLIO, 2001. .
 Green, William. War Planes of the Second World War: Volume Two Fighters. London: Macdonald, 1961. No ISBN.
 Ireland, Bernard. Aircraft Carriers of the World: An Illustrated A-Z Guide To Over 150 Ships. London: Southwater, 2007. .
 Lumsden, Alec. "Number Three: Fairey Fulmar." Aeroplane Monthly, June 1990.
 March, Daniel J. British Warplanes of World War II: Combat Aircraft of the RAF and the Fleet Air Arm, 1939–1945. Rochester, Kent, UK: Grange Books, 2000. .
 Mason, Francis K. The British Bomber since 1914. London: Putnam Aeronautical Books, 1994. .
 Mason, Francis K. The British Fighter since 1912. Annapolis, Maryland: Naval Institute Press, 1992. .
 Mason, Tim. The Secret Years: Flight Testing at Boscombe Down 1939–1945. Manchester, UK: Hikoki, 1998. .
 Ovčáčík, Michal and Karel Susa. Fairey Fulmar Mks. I, II, NF Mk. II, TT Mk. II. Prague, Czech Republic: Mark 1 Ltd., 2001. .
 Scholefield, R.A. Manchester Airport. Stroud, UK: Sutton Publishing, 1998. .
 
 Smith, Peter C. Mitsubishi Zero: Japan's Legendary Fighter. Pen and Sword, 2014. .
 .
 Taylor, John W.R. "Fairey Fulmar." Combat Aircraft of the World from 1909 to the present. New York: G. P. Putnam's Sons, 1969. .
 Thetford, Owen, British Naval Aircraft Since 1912. Annapolis, Maryland: Naval Institute Press, 1991. .
 Thomas, Orr. Royal Navy Aces of World War 2. Bloomsbury Publishing, 2013. .
 Winchester, Jim. "Fairey Fulmar." Aircraft of World War II (The Aviation Factfile). Kent, UK: Grange Books plc, 2004. .
 Wragg, David W. Malta, the Last Great Siege''. Casemate Publishers, 2003. .

External links

 Fleet Air arm archive
 The Convoy Got Through – The Fulmar in action – Summer 1941 
 Fairey Fulmar – British Aircraft Directory

1940s British fighter aircraft
Carrier-based aircraft
Fulmar
Single-engined tractor aircraft
Low-wing aircraft
Aircraft first flown in 1940